The Louisbourg Garrison (which constituted the bulk of the Île-Royale Garrison) was a French body of troops stationed at the fortress protecting the town of Louisbourg, Île-Royale on Cape Breton Island, Nova Scotia. They were stationed there from 1717-1758, with the exception of a brief period (1745-1749) when the colony was under British control.

Garrison

The Louisbourg/Isle Royale Garrison was made up of nine companies of troupes de la marine. One of these companies was a special artillery company. The garrison also included 150 men from the Swiss Karrer regiment. At any given time there were between 525-575 men in the Louisbourg garrison.  Each company in the garrison was commanded and administered by a captain who was fairly autonomous, although he would be subordinate to the etat-major. A widely held belief is that those living in Louisbourg garrison lived in miserable conditions. However the conditions in which the garrison lived were no worse than those of other eighteenth century soldiers. If a soldier in Louisbourg did not receive his rations in the prescribed amounts, he could easily hunt for food. Additionally, the soldiers at Isle Royale were supposed to receive an annual issue of clothing, although this was not always the case.

Swiss Karrer Regiment 
The Swiss regiment de Karrer in the Louisbourg Garrison was a considerably complicating element in the town of Louisbourg. The Swiss regiment was not organized in the same manner as the French companies with whom they shared the garrison.  The Swiss regiment operated as a larger company with three subaltern officers and nearly 150 men under the command of a captaine-lieutenant. The Swiss regiment had a special status notably in the area of judicial autonomy.

1744 Mutiny 

War broke out in the spring of 1744 between France and Great Britain. The war led French traders to be reluctant in sending ships full of commodities to New France for fear of the ships being captured. This led to a shortage of food and resources for the soldiers and population within the town. In the spring of 1744 the French held several British soldiers captive at Louisbourg. With a shortage of food already a pressing concern the presence of prisoners of war only worsened the matter. To help deal with the problem, the government in Louisbourg cut the garrison’s pay, as well as reducing their rations. The rations the men did receive were dismal. Bakers used rotten flour to make bread. One soldier described the bread as being completely inedible.  What good flour the government had, they kept in the storehouse and sold it to the civilian population of Louisbourg.

On December 27, 1744 the men assembled in the Courtyard near the King’s Bastion. It was there that they formally informed their superiors of the three major grievances they had. Firstly, they complained of the stale vegetables they were receiving. Secondly, they complained of the unpaid labor they were forced to do for the benefit of the King and private citizens. Lastly, the men of the garrison charged that they were owed compensation for participating in an expedition against Canso earlier in the year and for the booty they were promised but never received.  The garrison’s grievances were essentially complaints about material losses and their mutinous actions did not seem to contest the hierarchical structure of the military in Louisbourg.

Following the incident in the courtyard the soldiers of Île-Royale seized control of the town and fort. In the ensuing days, the rebels' control of the town caused great anxiety amongst the civilian population. Shopkeepers and artisans were threatened with swords to sell their goods at what the mutineers thought was a "fair price". The colonial authorities could not call in reinforcements to put down the revolt because at the time Great Britain controlled the seas and access to Canada was blocked because the river was frozen over.

On May 11, 1745, six months after the mutiny had begun, Louisbourg came under attack from the British. Francois Bigot, the financial commissary of Louisbourg, successfully convinced the leaders of the mutiny to stop the rebellion and rejoin with their officers to fight off the English invaders. However, the fifty-five-day siege ended with the French surrender of the fort and the garrison’s evacuation. The mutiny leaders were court-martialed for the rebellion and several condemned to death. The Karrer regiment would not return to Louisbourg when the French regained control in 1749.

Misdemeanors, infractions, and punishments 
Misdemeanors were common in the Louisbourg garrison. Studies show that during a nineteen-month period between 1752-1753 there were over 1196 infractions. It works out to about 63 offenses a month. One of the most serious crimes was desertion. Desertion was a major problem in the Louisbourg garrison.  One Louisbourg officer described desertion as an "incurable illness". A French soldier in the garrison who deserted to an English colony would be punished with death if caught. If the soldier deserted to the forest, his punishment would be service in the Mediterranean galleys. In 1717 the law was changed and all deserters were to receive death. Other common misdemeanors in the Louisbourg garrison included public drunkenness, uniform or equipment infractions, incidents of disobedience or lack of respect, infractions in the barracks rooms, absences, incidents of violence or noise, blasphemy or swearing and theft or illegal sale of goods.

See also
Military history of Nova Scotia

References

History of Nova Scotia
Acadian history